Naberezhne is a rural locality (a settlement) in Ukraine, Odesa Raion, Odesa Oblast. It belongs to Usatove rural hromada, one of the hromadas of Ukraine, and is one of 15 villages in the hromada. It has a population of 914.

Until 18 July 2020, Naberezhne belonged to Biliaivka Raion. The raion was abolished in July 2020 as part of the administrative reform of Ukraine, which reduced the number of raions of Odesa Oblast to seven. The area of Biliaivka Raion was merged into Odesa Raion.

Population Census 
As of January 12, 1989, Naberezhne had a population of 841. 837 men and 4 women. 

As of December 5, 2001, Naberezhne had a population of 914.

Language Distribution 
It shows Naberezhne's language distribution.

See also 
Usatove

References

Villages in Odesa Raion
Usatove Hromada